Live! Be in It is the first live album by Australian rock band Skyhooks. It was released by Mushroom Records on cassette and vinyl in December 1978 in Australia and on CD in 1991.
The live recordings are taken from various concerts around Melbourne from December 1975 to July 1978.

Track listing

Charts

Personnel
 Greg Macainsh – bass guitar, vocals, production
 Steve Malpass – cover design, art direction 
 Freddy Kaboodleschnitzer – drums, vocals
 Bob Spencer – guitar, vocals 
 Bongo Starr – guitar, vocals 
 Red Symons – guitar, vocals 
 Michael Gudinski – management 
 Merry Took – percussion 
 David Parker – cover photography
 Bob King – liner bag photography
 David Parker – liner bag photography
 Danny Robinson – vocals 
 Shirley Strachan – vocals

References

External links
Album at Discogs

1978 live albums
Live albums by Australian artists
Skyhooks (band) albums
Mushroom Records live albums